Goseong County (Goseong-gun) is a county in South Gyeongsang Province, South Korea

Administrative divisions
Goseong-gun is divided into 1 eup and 13 myeon.
Goseong-eup
Daega-myeon
Donghae-myeon
Gaecheon-myeon
Georyu-myeon
Guman-myeon
Hai-myeon
Hail-myeon
Heohwa-myeon
Maan-myeon
Samsan-myeon
Sangri-myeon
Yeonghyeon-myeon
Yeongo-myeon

Location
Goseong-gun is located at the southern end of central Gyeongnam. It was the capital of Sogaya, an ancient kingdom of advanced culture. It is endowed with natural tourism resources of beautiful mountains, ocean, and fields.

It is adjacent to Geoje, Sacheon, Tongyeong, Masan, and Jinju. It is also linked to the Daejeon-Tongyeong Expressway, National Roads No. 14 and No. 33.

Climate
Its location is quite southern, which makes the climate mild and warm all year around. That is, Goseong is classified as an oceanic climate. The southeast wind blows during the summer and the northwest wind, which is the seasonal wind, blows during the winter.

Festival
Goseong was the center of the Gaya kingdom during ancient years. Goseong county held an annual "Sogaya festival" reemerging marching of ancient people with legends.

Additionally, events also deal with General Yi Sun-sin who beat Japanese invaders at Danghangpo which is near port of Goseong.

Between 1 April and 12 June 2016, the county will host the Gyeongnam Goseong Dinosaur World Expo (see 'Fossil sites' below for more info).

Cluster
Goseong was designated as a cluster for shipbuilding, including development with its neighbor, Geoje area.

In July 2007, the Ministry of Finance and Economy confirmed the establishment of the complex after securing the land. The construction began in April 2008.

Fossil sites
Goseong is known for, among other things, its fossilized dinosaur footprints. The county will host the Gyeongnam Goseong Dinosaur World Expo in 2016 for 73 days, between 1 April and 12 June, at Danghangpo Tourist Site and Sangjogam County Park. Goseong county participated in the International dinosaur festival of Zigong, Sichuan Province of China which is a sister city.

The whole area was on the way of propelling registration of UNESCO natural heritages with other southern coast-lying regions. Fossil sites on the southern coast of Korea are the largest scale in Asia.

Tourist attractions 
 Goseong Dinosaur Museum
 Sangjokam County Park 
 Goseong Ogwangdae - Korea Mask Dance Drama
 Danghangpo Tourist Resort
 Mt. Yeonhwa Provincial Park
 Namsan Park 
 Okcheon Temple
 Munsuam
 Songhakdong Gobungun - presumed to be tombs of political leaders of the Gaya period around A.D. 600.
 Unheung Temple
 Jangui Temple
 Mt. Geumtae Gyesung Temple

Agricultural and Marine Products 
 Agricultural products: Dinosaur land rice, green pumpkin, hot pepper, sweet persimmon, pumpkin, chinamul, mushroom, cherry tomato, Goseong persimmon, strawberry
 Marine products: anchovy, Goseong Gaetjangeo (hamo) Hoe - raw fish, giant prawn, oyster.

Notable people
 Jung Jung-suk (1982-2011) was a South Korean women's football player.
 Kim Cheong (1941–Present) is a poet and writer.
Yu Song-jin (born 1964/1965), South Korean engineer

Sister cities
 Yeongdeungpo, South Korea
 Zigong, China

See also
 Sim Bong-geun, Goseong native and President of Dong-A University.
 Danghangpo Battle, a battle that happen in modern Danghang-ri, Hoehwa-myeon.

References

External links
County government website

 
Counties of South Gyeongsang Province